Kobe Vidal Crawford Jr . (born August 20, 1998), known professionally as NoCap, is an American rapper and singer. He is signed to YoungBoy's Never Broke Again and Atlantic Records. Since 2017, he has released 6 albums, one EP and five mixtapes. His highest-charting project, Mr. Crawford, was released in April 2022, peaking at number 8 on the Billboard 200. He is noted for his use of wordplay.

Early life 
Kobe Vidal Crawford was born and raised in Mobile, Alabama. Crawford begun to show interest in music at the age of nine, receiving inspiration from his mother's boyfriend at the time. He would continue to locally perform live shows alongside his brother, however, as the relationship between his mother and her boyfriend ended, Crawford would take a break from music until his teenage years.

Career
NoCap began his career in earnest with the release of his first EP, Joker, in May 2017. In early 2018, he released the song "Legend". The music video for that song accumulated over 1 million views on YouTube and would appear on NoCap's debut mixtape, Neighborhood Hero, in July 2018. He followed that with a collaborative mixtape, Rogerville, with Rylo Rodriguez in September 2018. In November of that year, he was featured on the Lil Baby track, "Dreams 2 Reality", off the mixtape, Street Gossip.

In March 2019, NoCap released the single, "Punching Bag" produced by CashMoneyAP. Later that month, he released another single, "Ghetto Angels" ". Ghetto Angels has totaled more than 80 million views on Youtube and was certified Platinum by the Recording Industry Association of America. In May, NoCap and Polo G were featured on the CashMoneyAP song, "No Patience". Later that month, he released his second solo mixtape The Backend Child. The project featured guest appearances from Rylo Rodriguez ("Dead Faces"), OMB Peezy ("Demons"), and Quando Rondo ("New Ones"). NoCap also released music videos for songs off the album including those for "Blind Nights", "Set It Off", and "No Jewelry".

In July 2019, NoCap delivered a freestyle as a part of DJ Booths Bless The Booth series on Tidal. The following month, he released the single, "Exotic", and performed another freestyle on the HotNewHipHop Freestyle Session. He was also featured on the Mozzy song, "Sad Situations". In November 2019, NoCap released his third mixtape, The Hood Dictionary. The album featured guest appearances from Quando Rondo, Lil Durk, and Jagged Edge and peaked at number 80 on the Billboard 200. On July 16, 2020, NoCap released his fourth mixtape, Steel Human, which debuted at number 31 on the Billboard 200.

In December 2020, NoCap said on Instagram that he would be turning himself in to authorities, in connection to a shooting in which he reportedly fired shots at someone his sister had an altercation with. He was charged with shooting into an occupied dwelling and reckless endangerment. He also announced his debut studio album Mr. Crawford. The twenty-one track album was eventually released on April 29, 2022, and includes the singles "Vaccine (Falling Star)", "Very Special" and "I'll Be Here". It debuted at number 8 on the Billboard 200, selling 29,000 copies in its first week and becoming his highest charting project.

Legal issues

2019: Shooting charge 
In late 2019, Crawford turned himself in to the Alabama Police Department. Crawford was later charged with firing a gun in an occupied building, possession of a controlled substance, and felony violation of probation. He was charged alongside his sister Brianna Crawford who was charged with shooting into an occupied building and reckless endangerment. Sgt. LaDerrick DuBose with the Mobile Police Department stated:

2020-2021: Probation violation 
In the December of 2020, Crawford had taken to his official Instagram to announce that he had thirty days to turn himself in:

On January 11, 2021, Crawford turned himself in to police in Alabama regarding his September 2019 case where he allegedly violated his parole. Almost seven months after NoCap's incarceration, on July 21, 2021, he was released from jail.

Discography

Studio album

Mixtapes

Collaborative Mixtapes

Extended plays

Singles

As lead artist

As featured artist

Other charted and certified songs

Guest appearance

References

External links

Living people
Rappers from Alabama
Musicians from Mobile, Alabama
Singers from Alabama
American hip hop record producers
Record producers from Alabama
Songwriters from Alabama
African-American male rappers
1998 births
Atlantic Records artists
African-American songwriters
21st-century African-American people
American male songwriters